Portrait of Joan Baez is the first compilation album by Joan Baez, released in the UK in 1967. It includes material from her early 1960s traditional folk and her Bob Dylan and Phil Ochs covers. The album is mono and was released on Vinyl in the UK. It features a mix of studio and live recordings.

Track listing
"There But For Fortune" (Phil Ochs)
"Don't Think Twice, It's Alright" (Bob Dylan)
"The Trees They Do Grow High" (Traditional)
"Copper Kettle" (Albert Frank Beddoe)
"Mary Hamilton" (Traditional)
"Plaisir d'amour" (Jean-Pierre Claris de Florian/Jean-Paul-Égide Martini)
"Colours" (Donovan)
"Geordie" (Traditional)
"Farewell, Angelina" (Bob Dylan)
"All My Trials" (Traditional)
"It Ain't Me, Babe" (Bob Dylan)
"We Shall Overcome" (Guy Carawan, Frank Hamilton, Zilphia Horton, Pete Seeger)

Notes and references 

Albums produced by Maynard Solomon
Portrait of Joan Baez
Joan Baez live albums
Portrait of Joan Baez
1960 live albums
Vanguard Records compilation albums
Vanguard Records live albums